Federal Route 246 (formerly Negeri Sembilan State Route N17 (Batu Kikir - Kampung Jambu Lapan side)) is a federal road in Negeri Sembilan, Malaysia. The Kilometre Zero of the Federal Route 246 is at Batu Kikir. This road is an inland road that connects to Bahau from Batu Kikir. The more popular option is Route 13 near Juasseh.

Features
At most sections, the Federal Route 246 was built under the JKR U5 road standard, allowing maximum speed limit of up to 50 km/h.

List of junctions and towns

References

Malaysian Federal Roads